Kirovgrad is a town in Sverdlovsk Oblast, Russia. Population:

History

The settlement Kalatay (Kala-ata in Turkic means "father's place") was, according to various sources, founded in 1661, 1663, or 1675. In 1932, it was given its present name; after Sergey Kirov, a prominent Bolshevik.

Administrative and municipal status
Within the framework of the administrative divisions, it is, together with the town of Verkhny Tagil and ten rural localities, incorporated as the Town of Kirovgrad—an administrative unit with the status equal to that of the districts. As a municipal division, Kirovgrad and eight rural localities are incorporated as Kirovgradsky Urban Okrug. The town of Verkhny Tagil, together with two other rural localities, is incorporated separately as Verkhny Tagil Urban Okrug.

Notable people
 
 
Galina Kurlyandskaya (born 1961), Russian physicist

References

Notes

Sources

Cities and towns in Sverdlovsk Oblast